Polylophota is a genus of snout moths. It was described by George Hampson in 1906.

Species
Some species of this genus are:
Polylophota aruensis Kenrick 1912
Polylophota atriplagalis Hampson, 1916
Polylophota barbarossa Hampson, 1906
Polylophota senilis  Janse 1931

References

External links
Images at boldsystems.org

Epipaschiinae
Pyralidae genera